Beinn nan Caorach (774 m) is a mountain in the Northwest Highlands of Scotland, It is located near the village of Corran in Lochalsh.

One of the smaller mountains in the immediate area, it is often climbed in conjunction with its higher neighbour Beinn na h-Eaglaise. It provides a fine viewpoint from its summit.

References

Mountains and hills of the Northwest Highlands
Marilyns of Scotland
Corbetts